Terrorbird is the debut album release by Los Angeles-based experimental punk band The Mae Shi. It was released in July 2004 on CD by 5 Rue Christine and on vinyl by Strictly Amateur Films. The original pressing of the record was limited to 500 copies.


Track listing
 Terror Bird
 Power to the Power. Bite 2
 Revelation Two
 Revelation Three
 Jubilee
 Untitled
 Hieronymus Bosch Is a Dead Man
 Chop 2
 Takoma the Dolphin Is AWOL
 Vampire Beats
 Surf's Up
 Bite 1. Bite 3
 Testify
 Terror Bird
 Revelation Six
 One Mississippi, Two Mississippi, Three Mississippi
 Vampire Zoo
 Body 1. Bite 1
 Body 2
 Do This
 Hard Luck Built New England
 Megamouth
 Revelation Four
 V. Beats
 Bite 4
 Chop 1
 Virgin's Diet, the Hand of Wolves
 Jubilation
 Repetition
 Repetition
 Repetition
 Repetition
 Repetition

References

 https://web.archive.org/web/20080218044439/http://www.mae-shi.com/sounds.html

2004 debut albums
The Mae Shi albums
5 Rue Christine albums
Kill Rock Stars albums